Pennsylvania Station (often abbreviated Penn Station) is a name applied by the Pennsylvania Railroad (PRR) to several of its grand passenger terminals. Several are still in active use by Amtrak and other transportation services; others have been demolished.

In the early 20th century, different railroad companies typically built separate stations, especially in major cities or towns, so the stations usually took the name of the companies. If various railroads cooperated to use the same station, the combined depot often took the name Union Station.

Baltimore

Baltimore, Maryland's Union Station was renamed Penn Station on August 1, 1928. Amtrak Northeast Corridor intercity service and MARC commuter service still operate through the station; the station is also served by a spur of the Baltimore Light Rail. Although bearing the full name Pennsylvania Station, it is typically referred to simply as Penn Station in nearly all situations.

Cincinnati

The PRR station in Cincinnati, Ohio, at Pearl and Butler Streets, built in 1880, was named Pennsylvania Station. It was supplanted with the opening of Cincinnati Union Terminal in 1933.

Cleveland
Cleveland, Ohio's old Lakefront Union Depot was renamed Penn Station on April 28, 1946. It was last used September 27, 1953, and service was cut back the next day to Euclid Avenue.

Harrisburg

Harrisburg, Pennsylvania's Union Station was also known as Penn Station. It was built in 1887 and rebuilt in 1905. It was shared by Reading Railroad, Northern Central Railway, and the Cumberland Valley Railroad, until the Reading Railroad built a separate station in Harrisburg. Today it has the name Harrisburg Transportation Center and serves Amtrak's Keystone Service and Pennsylvanian intercity lines, along with Greyhound, Trailways, and local bus services.

Jersey City

Pennsylvania Railroad Station in Jersey City, New Jersey, opened in 1834, was the terminus for New York City market trains prior to the construction of the North River Tunnels under the Hudson River and the Pennsylvania Station in New York City. In the 1920s, the station took on the name Exchange Place, in contrast to the main station across the Hudson River. Train service to the station ended in November 1961 and demolition of the complex was completed in 1963.

Newark

Newark, New Jersey's Penn Station opened in 1935, replacing a smaller structure. It now serves NJ Transit trains, buses and Newark Light Rail, Amtrak Northeast Corridor and other intercity trains, PATH trains to Jersey City/Lower Manhattan and Greyhound buses.

New York City

Manhattan's Penn Station opened September 8, 1910, for Long Island Rail Road trains by means of the new tunnel under the East River. Serving more than 600,000 commuter rail and Amtrak passengers a day, it is the busiest passenger transportation hub in the Western Hemisphere. The name was adopted by the PRR on March 1, 1909. The opening of the Hell Gate Bridge on April 1, 1917, brought New York, New Haven and Hartford Railroad intercity trains into Penn Station. The station now services Amtrak's Northeast Corridor and Empire Corridor, as well as New Jersey Transit and Long Island Rail Road commuter trains.

New York City Subway stations named for the intercity terminal include 34th Street–Penn Station (IND Eighth Avenue Line) and 34th Street–Penn Station (IRT Broadway–Seventh Avenue Line).

Philadelphia

Philadelphia, Pennsylvania's 30th Street Station was named Pennsylvania Station when the upper (commuter) level opened on September 28, 1930. It was renamed Pennsylvania Station–30th Street on April 26, 1933, soon after the lower (intercity) level opened on March 12. Intercity PRR trains used that station, while commuter trains continued east to terminate at Suburban Station. The station is still used by Amtrak intercity service, New Jersey Transit Atlantic City service, and SEPTA commuter service.

Pittsburgh

Pittsburgh, Pennsylvania's Union Station was renamed Penn Station on December 17, 1912. It is still used by Amtrak intercity service.

Penn Central Station
With the 1968 merger of the PRR into Penn Central, several of the Pennsylvania Stations were renamed on June 6 to Penn Central Station. Notable examples include Philadelphia's Pennsylvania Station–30th Street, which became Penn Central Station–30th Street, Baltimore, Trenton and Newark Pennsylvania stations, Michigan Central Station in Detroit, Michigan, New York Central Railroad's (NYC) Buffalo Central Station and Pittsburgh's Pennsylvania Station became simply Penn Central Station. The exception to this was Pennsylvania Station in New York City, because Penn Central also operated Grand Central Terminal.

PRR stations not named Pennsylvania Station
Other major PRR terminals that never received the Penn Station name include: Chicago's Union Station, Cincinnati's Union Terminal, and Washington, D.C.'s Union Station. These were all used by other railroads in addition to the PRR.

Further reading
  370pp

External links

References

 
Penn Central Transportation